Pippin apple may refer to:

 Allington Pippin
 Cox's Orange Pippin
 King of the Pippins
 Newtown Pippin
 Ribston Pippin
 Sturmer Pippin

See also
 List of apple cultivars
 Apple Pippin, a multimedia technology platform

Apples